Bini (stylized as BINI) (Hyphenation: bi‧ni; IPA: /bini/, [bɪ.nɪ]) is a Filipino girl group under ABS-CBN's Star Magic that is formed through Star Hunt Academy (SHA), and is composed of eight members: Aiah, Colet, Maloi, Gwen, Stacey, Mikha, Jhoanna, and Sheena. The group's pre-debut single "Da Coconut Nut" was released on November 20, 2020. BINI officially debuted on June 11, 2021, with their debut single "Born to Win".

Name

Group name 
The group's name was taken from the Tagalog word binibini which means "young lady", a nod to the group's vision to "embody the idea of a modern Filipina — sweet, fierce, independent, and informed."

Fandom name 
Fans of Bini are known as "Bloom(s)", commonly stylized as BLM(S) with the infinity symbol replacing the Os taking inspiration from the group's tagline Walo hanggang dulo (Eight until the end). The name serves as a lovely reminder of Bini's story and journey, it stands for the beginning of springtime that there's always beauty after every cold trial. It was chosen by the Bini members among the name suggestions of the fans during a special announcement livestream on February 13, 2021.

History

2018–2020: Star Hunt Academy 
For many years, believing that "the Filipino talent has a place in the global stage," Laurenti Dyogi, ABS-CBN's Head of Entertainment Production, thought of forming a training camp where youth aspiring to become superstars "can develop or further hone their talents." In 2018, ABS-CBN finally launched the Star Hunt Academy program, which had 250 auditionees between the ages of 16 to 19 years old from all over the Philippines. From this pool of auditionees, in addition to recommendations by talent scouts, the first set of female Star Hunt Academy trainees were selected, which was originally composed of 11 girls. While Dyogi initially planned to debut a 9-member idol girl group, the 11 girl trainees were eventually trimmed down to 8 girls: Maraiah Queen Arceta (Aiah), Nicolette Vergara (Colet), Mary Loi Ricalde (Maloi), Gwenyth Apuli (Gwen), Stacey Aubrey Sevilleja (Stacey), Mikhaela Lim (Mikha), Sheena Mae Catacutan (Sheena), and Jhoanna Robles (Jhoanna). Two members, Sheena and Gwen, were originally housemates from Pinoy Big Brother: Otso Batch 3.

The group was trained from 2018 to 2020 under esteemed local coaches like professional vocal coach and former chair of the Department of Voice, Music Theater and Dance at the University of the Philippines College of Music Kitchy Molina, and Austrian-born dance coach Mickey Perz, as well as South Korean coaches from MUdoctor Academy.

On August 3, 2019, the group as SHA trainees were initially introduced on the online pre-show of the PBB Otso Big Night, in which they first performed and were debuted as Star Hunt Academy trainees.  They also experienced performing in front of a live audience, showcasing the fruits of their hours of rigorous trainings in their first-ever mall show in Taguig and at least two ABS-CBN events. They also appeared in a 2019 National Youth Commission event, where they were proclaimed as Youth Ambassadors, and at the 2019 Manila Southeast Asian Games thanksgiving celebration.

In May 2020, Laurenti Dyogi released a performance practice video of the group singing and dancing to 'Ngiti' by Young JV and Gary Valenciano on Twitter to show their progress in training.

In August 2020, the group participated in the Philippine Kpop Convention's Happy Hallyu Day 4 event, performing K-pop dance covers, including Red Velvet's In & Out, Blackpink's How You Like That and Twice's More & More.

2020: Pre-debut, Da Coconut Nut Era 
For the group's pre-debut single, MU Doctor Academy and Korean music production group VO3E collaborated to transform the popular novelty song 'Da Coconut Nut' into an electro-pop remake, originally composed by Filipino musician and National Artist Ryan Cayabyab. MUdoctor Academy(뮤닥터아카데미) also collaborated with choreographers Moon Yeon Joo(문연주) and Kwak Seong Chan(곽성찬), who formerly worked with big groups from South Korea like Twice, BTS, Red Velvet, and Seventeen, to create the choreography.

On November 6, 2020, the official lyric video of their pre-debut single 'Da Coconut Nut' premiered on the group's official YouTube channel following the release of various teasers and the announcement of their group name, Bini. The official music video then premiered on November 20.

On November 21, 2020, Bini performed their first live performance of 'Da Coconut Nut' on the noontime variety show It's Showtime.

On December 4, 2020, Bini signed a contract with Star Magic and Star Music.

2021-present: Debut with Born to Win 

On May 4, 2021, BINI released their first official debut teaser through a QR code leading to an image that reads "Are you ready for the BINIverse?". This was then followed by multiple of teasers leading to their debut.

On the same month, their music label, Star Music, announces the group's official debut with single entitled "Born to Win".

On May 8, 2021, it was announced that BINI's much awaited debut will happen in two parts, Part I: The Runway, which will be held on June 4, 2021, and Part II: The Showcase, which will be held on June 11, 2021.

BINI's debut single "Born to Win" was released on Friday, June 4, 2021, on various streaming platforms together with the official lyric video, which premiered on Star Music's official YouTube Channel. On the same day, the group had the first part of their debut launch 'BINI: The Runway', which was held via KTX.PH. 'The Runway' brought together fashion and music as the group donned creations that were especially designed for each BINI member by renowned Filipino designer Francis Libiran. On the same day, Metro released an article about the group's debut, which included never before seen pictures of the girls show-casing their Francis Libiran made outfits in their Metro photoshoot.

The second part of BINI's debut launch, 'The Showcase' was held on June 11, 2021, where BINI interacted with fans and treated them to a mini-concert experience, flaunting their sharp and synchronized choreography as they performed their pre-debut song “Da Coconut Nut” before flawlessly transitioning into "Born to Win". The girls also showed off their vocal prowess and electrifying dance moves in three unit performances: Gwen and Sheena performed KZ Tandingan’s “Tagu-Taguan,” Colet, Jhoanna, and Maloi belted out Janine Berdin’s “Biyaya,” while Aiah, Stacey, and Mikha impressed with their rap song “World War C,” their original composition about having strength amid the pandemic.'The Showcase' also let fans in on the personal journey of each BINI member and never-before-seen footage of the girls’ rigorous training sessions under ABS-CBN's Star Hunt Academy.

The official music video for "Born to Win" premiered on 'The Showcase', as well as BINI's official YouTube channel on June 11, 2021.

On June 13, 2021, BINI had their first live performance as a debuted group, performing their debut single "Born to Win" on ASAP. This was followed by multiple interviews, guestings, and performances on Magandang Buhay, It's Showtime, MYXclusive, and more.

In August 2021, the group participated in the Philippine Kpop Convention's Happy Hallyu Day 5 event, performing K-pop dance covers, such as ITZY's "WANNABE", Girls' Generation's "The Boys", Mamamoo's ' "HIP", and the group's debut single "Born to Win".

Following the release of their debut single, BINI released their 3rd official single entitled "Kapit Lang" on September 10, 2021. The official music video premiered on BINI's official YouTube channel at midnight. The era continues by inspiring the world to keep pushing through the tough times.

On September 30, 2021, the Coronation Night of the Philippines' most prestigious beauty pageant, Miss Universe Philippines 2021, BINI performed a new spin on their debut single "Born to Win". The song was also used as the official song of the Preliminary Swimsuit and Evening Gown Competition of Miss Universe Philippines 2021.

In February 2022, the group was featured on Xpedition's cover as "The Burgeoning Grace" that made BINI as one of the first Filipino celebrities, alongside brother group BGYO, to have a NFT magazine cover and the first ever in the Middle East region launched through the Metaverse.

Artistry
Bini's pre-debut single, "Da Coconut Nut" (2020), is a genre-bending Original Pilipino Music or P-Pop infuses with Electronic music elements. It was adapted from the classic Filipino novelty song of the same name. The version of this iconic novelty song was given a new flavor, upbeat, fun and light. ABS-CBN News' Zin Francis Alcasid noted that “the group is presented as identifiably Filipino, aside from the pre-debut single being an Electropop revival of an iconic OPM tune, the sound and phrasing is also very Pinoy”.

Other ventures

Philanthropy
On November 16, 2019, as the Youth Ambassadors of National Youth Commission, the group took part in the 2019 FITFIL YOUTH AGAINST DRUGS (and Obesity) campaign to encourage youths to stay fit and to have a healthy lifestyle. The event was held at the SM Mall of Asia by the Bay.

On November 28, 2020, the group participated on a virtual fundraising concert entitled #TikTokTogetherPH hosted by TikTok Philippines for the benefit of Generation Hope, World Vision, Philippine Animal Welfare Society (PAWS), and Balcony Entertainment along with other artists and vloggers in the Philippines namely: Rico Blanco, Ebe Dancel, Mayonnaise, The Itchyworms, Top Suzara, Zild, Donnalyn Bartolome, Maris Racal, Ella Cruz, Kyline Alcantara, Ranz & Niana, BGYO, Leanne & Naara, JMKO, Al James, ALLMO$T, Soulstice, Nik Makino, Never the Strangers, The Good Times, Ashley Julianne Raven, Bandang Lapis, Juan Caoile, Mona Gonzales, Chloe Redondo, and Mikey Bustos.

On December 8, 2020, Bini along with the boy group BGYO held a joint auction charity event called #BINIficiaryAucSHAn for the benefit of Typhoon Ulysses victims. The project ended up raising a total of ₱125,642, from the groups' auctioned trainee shirts, as well as several other belongings and from the fund raised via Kumu. All the proceeds were donated to the Cagayan and Isabela relief operations through ABS-CBN Foundation – Sagip Kapamilya.

On December 20, 2020, the group performed on ABS-CBN's “Ikaw ang Liwanag at Ligaya: The ABS-CBN Christmas Special” pre-show entitled “KTnX ang Babait Ninyo: ABS-CBN Christmas Special Fundraising Show” for the segment "P-Pop RISE", a benefit show for the survivors and evacuees in areas hit by typhoons such as Rolly and Ulysses through “Tulong-Tulong sa Pag-Ahon”, a public service campaign of ABS-CBN Foundation – Sagip Kapamilya, along with other P-Pop idol groups MNL48, Baby Blue, BGYO and PHP.

On March 28, 2021, the group was invited to perform on "POSITIVE VIBES FOR THE POSITIVE+", a benefit concert organized by the award-winning director Cathy Garcia Molina for NICKL Entertainment via Kumu, along with other artists from Pinoy Big Brother, Star Magic, Polaris, Star Hunt Academy and the boy group BGYO.

Webcast
On March 15, 2021, ABS-CBN announced that they are partnering with the filipino social networking service Kumu to bring over 100 Kapamilya artists that will stream on the app, participate in Kumu campaigns, and get to interact with their fans more regularly on the platform, it is touted as the biggest celebrity streaming partnership in the country.

Among the stars that will be bringing their talents and star power to Kumu are the Big 4 and other ex-housemates of Pinoy Big Brother: Connect, rising P-Pop groups BGYO, BINI, and MNL48 and more artists from Star Magic, Star Hunt, Polaris (It's Showtime talents), Star Music, and RISE Artists Studio.

Members

Works

Awards and nominations

Local

International

See also
2021 in Philippine music
2022 in Philippine music

Notes

References

External links
 
 BINI's account on Twitter

Filipino pop music groups
Filipino girl groups
Musical groups established in 2020
Musical groups from Metro Manila
ABS-CBN personalities
Star Magic
2020 establishments in the Philippines